The 2008–09 Australian Figure Skating Championships was held in Brisbane from 16 through 23 August 2008. Skaters competed in the disciplines of men's singles, ladies' singles, ice dancing, and synchronized skating across many levels, including senior, junior, novice, adult, and the pre-novice disciplines of primary and intermediate.

Senior results

Men

Ladies

Ice dancing

Synchronized

External links
 2008–09 Australian Figure Skating Championships results

2008 in figure skating
2009 in figure skating
Fig
Fig
Australian Figure Skating Championships